"Inside of You" is the second single released from the American rock band Hoobastank's third studio album, Every Man for Himself. The song reached number 27 on the Billboard Alternative Songs chart.

Description

The song begins with a short electronic beat, followed by the main guitar riff. Lyrically, the song contains clear sexual references, while evading profanity.  The music video for the song, directed by Lex Halaby, contains a well representation of the lyrics. The video shows the band behind various "peep shows", and showing attractive women watching with pleasure.

Chart performance

References

2006 singles
Hoobastank songs
2006 songs
Songs written by Doug Robb
Songs written by Dan Estrin
Island Records singles
Songs written by Chris Hesse